Gyöngyöshalász is a village in Heves County, Hungary.

The town is located between Gyöngyös and Atkár. A famous physicist, István Lovas was born in Gyöngyöshalász.

References

Populated places in Heves County